
Philosophical Investigations is a book by Wittgenstein.

Philosophical Investigations may also refer to:

Philosophy
 Philosophical Investigations (journal), an academic journal published by Wiley-Blackwell
 A book series covering diverse subjects in Applied Philosophy published by Routledge
 Linguistic and Philosophical Investigations, an academic journal published by Addleton Academic
 "Philosophical Investigations into the Essence of Human Freedom", a book by Friedrich Schelling

Literature
 A Philosophical Investigation, a novel by Philip Kerr

Film
A performance act by Linda Phillimore reading her poem "Philosophical Investigation #76"